The Tōgō Shrine (東郷神社 Tōgō-jinja) was established in 1940 and dedicated to Gensui (or 'Marshal-Admiral') the Marquis Tōgō Heihachirō shortly after his death. This shrine was destroyed by the Bombing of Tokyo, but was rebuilt in 1964. It is located in Harajuku, Tokyo, Japan.

There, the Marquis Tōgō Heihachirō is celebrated as a shinto kami.

A small museum and a bookshop dedicated to the Marquis Tōgō are located within the grounds of the shrine.

The shrine is located near the intersection of Takeshita Street and Meiji Avenue and is accessible from Harajuku Station.

The physical remains of the Gensui (or Grand Admiral) himself are interred at Tama Cemetery in Tokyo. According to The Telegraph, the Tōgō Shrine took possession in 2005 of Admiral Tōgō's original battle flag raised at the Battle of Tsushima; the flag had been in Britain since 1911.

Other shrines

As for General Nogi Maresuke who had several shrines throughout Japan named for him (Nogi Shrine), there are other Tōgō shrines, for example there is one at Tsuyazaki, Fukuoka, within earshot of the Battle of Tsushima won by the Marquis Tōgō.
Beppyo shrines

References

 Togo Heihachiro in images (図説東郷平八郎、目で見る明治の海軍), Tōgō Shrine and Tōgō Association (東郷神社・東郷会), (Japanese)

Shinto shrines in Tokyo
Buildings and structures in Japan destroyed during World War II
Religious buildings and structures completed in 1964
1940 establishments in Japan
Tōgō Heihachirō